WYYU (104.5 FM, "Mix 104.5") is a radio station broadcasting an adult contemporary music format, and licensed to serve Dalton, Georgia, United States.  The station is owned by North Georgia Radio Group, L.P. and features programming from CBS News Radio and Westwood One.

The station can be heard over much of northwest Georgia, and around and east of Chattanooga in southeast Tennessee.  It transmits from the ridge northeast of Dalton and northwest of Chatsworth, near Georgia 286.  Its studios and transmitter are separately located in Dalton.

History
The station went on the air as WAKP on April 28, 1995. On June 1, 1995, the station changed its call sign to the current WYYU.

References

External links
Mix 104.5 official website

YYU